Jesús Alejandro Gallardo Durazo (born 16 January 1988) is a former Mexican football goalkeeper who last played for Soles de Sonora in the Major Arena Soccer League.

Club career
Gallardo was a backup goalkeeper for Club Atlas. His debut and only game so far was against Chivas, when José Francisco Canales was sent off; he managed to keep a clean sheet.

Honours
Mexico U17
FIFA U-17 World Championship: 2005

References

External links

Profile at BDFA
Profile at LigaMX

1987 births
Living people
Footballers from Sonora
Association football goalkeepers
Mexico under-20 international footballers
Mexican people of Italian descent
Dorados de Sinaloa footballers
Atlas F.C. footballers
C.D. Veracruz footballers
Atlético San Luis footballers
Club Necaxa footballers
Correcaminos UAT footballers
Ascenso MX players
Liga Premier de México players
Major Arena Soccer League players
People from Magdalena de Kino
Indoor soccer goalkeepers
Mexican footballers